Rebecca Lusterio (born 3 December 1989) is a Filipino actress. She won the Gawad Urian and FAMAS awards. She is now married to a Danish national and is currently living in Denmark.

Biography
Rebecca Lusterio or Bikay for short, made an abrupt transition to show business when she was cast in the movie Muro-Ami in 1999. For her role, she was hailed as the Philippines' best child actress by both the FAMAS and STARS Awards.

She had some TV appearances in Manila but decided to return to Bohol to continue her studies at the San Agustin Academy (Panglao) in Panglao.

Five years later, she wowed viewers with her role in the Visayan movie Panaghoy sa Suba (The Call of the River), a Visayan romantic film shot in Bohol. The film takes place during the Japanese occupation of the Philippines.

She won the Best Supporting Actress Award in the 2004 Metro Manila Film Festival (MMFF).

Lusterio is the fourth among five children of a poor couple. Her father, Verano, is a fisherman. Meanwhile her mother, Helen, makes souvenir items out of seashells which Lusterio used to sell with her at the Alona Beach in Panglao. Lusterio and her family temporarily stayed at a rented house in Tawala, Panglao that only cost 600 pesos (around 12.36 USD as of 2021). They eventually left for greener pastures.

In 2004, the Colegio de San Juan de Letran offered a full-scholarship to Lusterio. She pursued Mass Communication.

Lusterio graduated as a scholar on 27 April 2010 with a degree in AB Communication Arts.

Awards and achievements
Lusterio won five awards and one nomination.

Awards

Facts
She appears in a music video of the Sangguniang Kabataan (SK) Federation headed by SK National President Jane Censoria Cajes. The video pays tribute to the young Boholano achievers in the Bohol Youth Week that took place on 26 May 2008.

Filmography

TV appearances
Kool Ka Lang, GMA 7 1998
Beh Bote Nga, GMA 7 1998
Mel and Joey, March 2005
Rated K, ABS-CBN, 2008

References

1989 births
Living people
Actresses from Bohol
Colegio de San Juan de Letran alumni
Filipino child actresses
Filipino film actresses
Filipino television actresses
People from Bohol
Visayan people